"NATO reporting names" are a system of code names used by NATO to denote military aircraft and other equipment used by the militaries of Russia, the rest of the former Soviet Union, other former Warsaw Pact countries and China, as well as other countries that use such weaponry. The system assists military communications by providing short, one or two-syllable names, as alternatives to the precise proper names – which may be easily confused under operational conditions or are unknown in the western world. 

The assignment of reporting names is managed by the Air Force Interoperability Council (AFIC), previously known as the Air Standardization Coordinating Committee or ASCC), which is separate from NATO. Based in Washington DC, AFIC comprises representatives from the militaries of three NATO members (Canada, the United Kingdom and United States) and two non-NATO countries (Australia and New Zealand).

When the system was introduced, in the 1950s, reporting names also implicitly designated potentially hostile aircraft.   
However, since the end of the Cold War, some NATO air forces have operated various aircraft types with reporting names, (e.g. the "Fulcrum" (Mikoyan MiG-29).

American variations
The United States Department of Defense (DOD) expands on the NATO reporting names in some cases. NATO refers to surface-to-air missile systems mounted on ships or submarines with the same names as the corresponding land-based systems, but the US DOD assigns a different series of numbers with a different suffix (i.e., SA-N- vis-à-vis. SA-) for these systems. The names are kept the same as a convenience. Where there is no corresponding system, a new name is devised.

Soviet nicknames
The Soviet Union did not always assign official "popular names" to its aircraft, but unofficial nicknames were common as in any air force. Generally, Soviet pilots did not use the NATO names, preferring a different, Russian, nickname. An exception was that Soviet airmen appreciated the MiG-29's codename "Fulcrum", as an indication of its pivotal role in Soviet air defence.

Nomenclature
To reduce the risk of confusion, unusual or made-up names were allocated, the idea being that the names chosen would be unlikely to occur in normal conversation, and be easier to memorise. For fixed-wing aircraft, single-syllable words denoted piston-prop and turboprop, while multiple-syllable words denoted jets. 
Bombers had names starting with the letter 'B' and names like "Badger" (Tupolev Tu-16), "Blackjack" (Tupolev Tu-160) and "Bear" (Tupolev Tu-95) were used. "Frogfoot," the reporting name for the Sukhoi Su-25, references the aircraft's close air support role. Transports had names starting with 'C' (for "cargo"), which resulted in names like "Condor" for the Antonov An-124 or "Candid" for the Ilyushin Il-76.

Lists of NATO reporting names

Missiles
The initial letter of the name indicated the use of that equipment.

 A—air-to-air missiles, example AA-2 Atoll: List of NATO reporting names for air-to-air missiles
 K—air-to-surface missiles (from the Russian Kh designation), example AS-17 Krypton: List of NATO reporting names for air-to-surface missiles
 G—surface-to-air missiles, SAM (or Ground-to-air), including ship- and submarine-launched, example SA-2 Guideline: List of NATO reporting names for surface-to-air missiles
 S—surface-to-surface missiles, 
ship- and submarine-launched. Land-based missiles have the prefix SS-, for example the SS-1 Scud. Naval missiles receive the designation SS-N-, e.g. SS-N-2 Styx. Coastal defence missiles are assigned the prefix SS-C-, e.g. SS-C-5 Stooge: List of NATO reporting names for surface-to-surface missiles
 reporting named for anti-tank missiles include AT-5 Spandrel:

Aircraft
The first letter indicates the type of aircraft, like eg 'Bear' for a bomber aircraft refers to the Tupolev Tu-95, or 'Fulcrum' for the Mikoyan-Gurevich MiG-29 fighter aircraft. For fixed-wing aircraft, one-syllable names are used for propeller aircraft and two-syllable name for aircraft with jet engines. This distinction is not made for helicopters.
 F—fighter aircraft, also later ground attack aircraft: List of AFIC reporting names for fighter aircraft
 B—bomber aircraft: List of NATO reporting names for bomber aircraft
 C—commercial aircraft and airliners, and cargo aircraft: List of NATO reporting names for transport aircraft
 H—helicopters: List of NATO reporting names for helicopters
 M—  miscellaneous names are used for trainers, reconnaissance, seaplanes, tankers, Airborne early warning

Submarines

Before the 1980s, reporting names for submarines were taken from the NATO spelling alphabet. Modifications of existing designs were given descriptive terms, such as "Whiskey Long Bin". From the 1980s, new designs were given names derived from Russian words, such as "Akula", or "shark". These names did not correspond to the Soviet names. Coincidentally, "Akula", which was assigned to an attack submarine by NATO, was the actual Soviet name for the ballistic missile submarine NATO named "Typhoon-class". The NATO names for submarines of the People's Republic of China are taken from Chinese dynasties.
 List of NATO reporting names for submarines

Equipment
 List of NATO reporting names for equipment

See also
 World War II Allied names for Japanese aircraft

References

External links
 Designations of Soviet and Russian Military Aircraft and Missiles
 Aerospace Web

 
Naming conventions
Military aviation
Naval warfare
Code names